Ferdinand De Wilton Ward, Jr. (1851–1925), known first as the "Young Napoleon of Finance," and subsequently as "the Best-Hated Man in the United States," was an American swindler. The collapse of his Ponzi scheme caused the financial ruin of many people, including famous persons such as Thomas Nast and the former U.S. President Ulysses S. Grant, who had joined his son, Ulysses S. "Buck" Grant. Jr., as a partner in Ward's banking business. Heavy losses were incurred by many other members of the extended Grant family.

Background
Ward was born in 1851 in Geneseo, New York, to Jane Ward and Reverend Ferdinand De Wilton Ward, who had been missionaries in India. He had a younger brother.

In 1873, Ward moved to New York City, and was a clerk at the Produce Exchange. Soon after his move, he stole money from a Sunday School and laundered it through a bank, substantially improving his situation. After marrying an heiress, Ella Champion Ward, née Green, in 1877, he was able to use her family's wealth for his advantage.

Ponzi scheme 
In 1880 he established his own banking and brokerage firm. One of the first investments in his firm came from James D. Fish, president of the Marine National Bank, who continued colluding in Ward's swindle until its collapse. Ward also came into contact with Ulysses S. "Buck" Grant. Jr., the son of former president Ulysses S. Grant, as his brother was a roommate of Grant Jr. at Columbia University. Eventually, Ward gained the trust and investments of Grant, Jr., whose name he attached to his own firm, now called Grant & Ward. Ward ran the company as a Ponzi scheme, claiming that he had inside access to government contracts, a claim which gained further credence when the former president later joined the firm as a full partner after investing $100,000 into the firm. Ward used the same securities over and over again as collateral against loans and paid off older investors with money raised from newer ones, along with paying investors high interest on investments. Some investors, such as the Grants, kept most of their funds in the firm, receiving 2-3% profits per month. 

While his fraudulence remained undetected, Ward found great success, gaining $9 million, a brownstone in New York, and a palatial 25-acre estate in Connecticut. The Grants also gained wealth through the elaborate scheme, which gave Ward the nickname "The Young Napoleon of Wall Street".

However, the scheme eventually collapsed on May 4, 1884, bankrupting the Grants, The Marine National Bank, Thomas Nast, and many other investors, and starting the Panic of 1884.  Despite the elder Grant taking out a $150,000 personal loan from his friend William H. Vanderbilt, the collapse was irreversible, and the securities lost. Ward himself fled. 

Ward was later brought before the New York Supreme Court, found guilty of fraud, and sentenced to ten years in prison. During his trial, Ward showed no remorse for his actions, explaining that he had to "rob Peter to pay Paul".

Later years 
During his time in prison at Sing Sing, Ward lived fairly comfortably through his connections, and was released after serving only six years. While he was imprisoned, his wife, Ella, willed her entire estate to the support, education, and maintenance of her son Clarence until he turned 25. Ella died in 1890, and the inheritance moved to Clarence, who moved in with Ella's family. This move deprived Ward of much of his wealth.

After his release, Ward attempted to gain back his wealth to no avail, pursuing legal avenues but also orchestrating a failed attempt to kidnap Clarence. In 1894, Ward married Isabella Ward, née Storer, and soon afterwards faded into relative obscurity, although he occasionally commented on the collapse of Grant & Ward and Ulysses S. Grant. He died in 1925 at the age of 74, and his wife died one year later.

Ward's grandson, F. Champion Ward, was a vice president at the Ford Foundation, and his great-grandson, Geoffrey C. Ward, is an author who wrote the book A Disposition to be Rich about his great-grandfather in 2013.

References
Notes

Bibliography
 McFeely,  William.  Grant: A Biography (NY: WW Norton & Co., 1981), 490–493. 
 Roberts, Russell. "The Wall Street Scandal of Grant and Ward,” Financial History #81 (Spring, 2004), 13–15
Ward, Geoffrey C. (2012), A Disposition to Be Rich: How a Small-Town Pastor's Son Ruined an American President, Brought on a Wall Street Crash, and Made Himself the Best-Hated Man in the United States. New York: Alfred A. Knopf. . (The author is his subject's great-grandson.)

External links
 Review of "A Disposition to Be Rich" in the New York Times Sunday Book Review, June 29. 2012
 "Read All About Geneseo's Dirty Rotten Scoundrel" in the Livingston County News, May 16, 2012
 
Geoffrey Ward collection on Ferdinand Ward and the Ward family, 1825-2012. Manuscripts and Archives, New York Public Library. (Finding aid for research material collected by Geoffrey Ward while writing A Disposition to Be Rich.)

1851 births
1925 deaths
American financiers
American prisoners and detainees
American people convicted of fraud
American confidence tricksters
Criminals from New York (state)
Financial scandals
People from Geneseo, New York
Pyramid and Ponzi schemes
American businesspeople convicted of crimes
Inmates of Sing Sing